Luis Alberto Blanco Saavedra (born 8 January 1978) is a Panamanian football coach and a former midfielder. He is an assistant coach with Independiente.

Club career
Nicknamed Satú, he started his career at hometown club San Francisco, then moved to Europe to play in the UEFA Champions League with Moldovan champions Sheriff Tiraspol where he played alongside compatriots Ubaldo Guardia and Roberto Brown. He then had a short stint at Russian outfit Alania Vladikavkaz before moving to the Middle East where he played for UAE side Al Ain and Al-Nasr in Saudi Arabia.

After spells at Plaza Amador and San Francisco, he moved abroad again when signing for Colombians Atlético Junior in February 2008. In 2009, he joined compatriot Alberto Zapata at Israeli team Maccabi Netanya, but left them in summer 2009.

On his return to Panama, he again played for San Francisco and Chorillo and joined Tauro in January 2011. He retired at second division side Atlético Nacional in 2013.

International career
Blanco made his debut for Panama in an October 1999 friendly match against Trinidad and Tobago and has earned a total of 60 caps, scoring 3 goals. He represented his country in 18 FIFA World Cup qualification matches and was a member of the 2005 CONCACAF Gold Cup team, who finished second in the tournament and he also played at the 2007 and 2009 CONCACAF Gold Cups.

His final international was a July 2009 CONCACAF Gold Cup match against Nicaragua.

International goals
Scores and results list Panama's goal tally first.

Honours

Club
Divizia Naţională (4):
2001-02, 2002-03, 2003-04, 2004-05
Moldavian Cup (1):
2001-02
UAE President Cup (1):
2005-06
Liga Panameña de Fútbol (1):
2007 (C)

References

External links

1978 births
Living people
Sportspeople from Panama City
Association football midfielders
Panamanian footballers
Panama international footballers
Panamá Viejo players
San Francisco F.C. players
FC Sheriff Tiraspol players
FC Spartak Vladikavkaz players
Al Ain FC players
Al Nassr FC players
C.D. Plaza Amador players
Atlético Junior footballers
Maccabi Netanya F.C. players
Unión Deportivo Universitario players
Tauro F.C. players
Panamanian expatriate footballers
Moldovan Super Liga players
Russian Premier League players
UAE Pro League players
Saudi Professional League players
Israeli Premier League players
Categoría Primera A players
2001 UNCAF Nations Cup players
2005 CONCACAF Gold Cup players
2007 UNCAF Nations Cup players
2007 CONCACAF Gold Cup players
2009 CONCACAF Gold Cup players
Expatriate footballers in Moldova
Expatriate footballers in Russia
Expatriate footballers in the United Arab Emirates
Expatriate footballers in Saudi Arabia
Expatriate footballers in Israel
Expatriate footballers in Colombia
Panamanian expatriate sportspeople in Moldova
Panamanian expatriate sportspeople in Russia
Panamanian expatriate sportspeople in the United Arab Emirates
Panamanian expatriate sportspeople in Saudi Arabia
Panamanian expatriate sportspeople in Israel
Panamanian expatriate sportspeople in Colombia
Central American Games silver medalists for Panama
Central American Games medalists in football
Panamanian football managers